Cochlodina dubiosa is a species of air-breathing land snail, a terrestrial pulmonate gastropod mollusk in the family Clausiliidae the door snails, all of which have a clausilium.

Distribution 
This species occurs in
 The Czech Republic

References

Clausiliidae
Gastropods described in 1882